Soltanabad-e rokh (also Romanized as Solţānābād-e rokh) is a village in Bala Rokh Rural District, Jolgeh Rokh District, Torbat-e Heydarieh County, Razavi Khorasan Province, Iran. At the 2006 census, its population was 1,763, in 416 families.

References 

Populated places in Torbat-e Heydarieh County